The Nottingham Lions are an ice hockey team from Nottingham, England that compete in the English National League's northern section. The Lions are the senior team of the Nottingham Ice Hockey Club and one of two senior teams based in Nottingham, the other being the professional Nottingham Panthers. The club were members of the English Premier League between 2000 and 2003 before transferring to their current league.

The Nottingham Lions were the 2007/08 English National League Northern and National Champions, beating Peterborough Islanders in the National championship.

The Lions also won the inaugural English National Ice Hockey League Playoffs, held at Coventry Skydome in April 2009.  The Lions beat the Southern Champions Invicta Dynamos in a penalty shootout, after the game finished level at 2-2 after sudden-death overtime.

Club roster 2022-23
(*) Denotes a Non-British Trained player (Import)

2021/22 Outgoing

External links
Official Website of the Nottingham Lions
Nottingham Lions on Elite Prospects

Ice hockey teams in England
Sport in Nottingham